Seirophora is a genus of lichenized fungi in the family Teloschistaceae.

References

Teloschistales genera
Lichen genera
Teloschistales